Rajasimha may refer to:

 Maravarman Rajasimha I, Pandyan king of present-day India
 Maravarman Rajasimha II, Pandyan king of present-day India
 Maravarman Rajasimha III, Pandyan king of present-day India
 Rajasinha I of Sitawaka, king of Sitawaka in present-day Sri Lanka
 Rajasinha II of Kandy, king of Kandy in present-day Sri Lanka
 Rajasimha (film)